Echigues Goçoy or Échiga Vizóiz, was a medieval Knight of the County of Portugal.

Echigues was married to Aragunte Soares, daughter of Suero de Novellas (count of Castilla) and Mayor Diaz descendant of Diego Rodríguez Porcelos.

Echigues Goçoy was a direct descendant of Sueiro Belfaguer.

References 

10th-century Portuguese people
11th-century Portuguese people
Medieval Portuguese nobility